The University of Computer Studies, Kalay (UCSK), is an IT and computer science university of Myanmar. The university offers bachelor's and master's aprograms in computer science and technology. It was opened on 27, September 2001 as Government Computer College (GCC). It was promoted as Computer University on 20, January 2007. UCSK is located 10 miles from Kalaymyo, Sagaing Region and 14 miles from Kalewa, near Ayethayar village. It has 38.6 acres.

Objectives
 To produce more experts who have the practical ability to invent, install, repair, experiment with, and apply computer hardware and software with a view to making Myanmar a modern and developed nation.
 To foster the outstanding products of the University to become high caliber experts.
 To conduct research contributing to the welfare of the nation and to carry out research and development activities on Information Technology utilizing the high caliber experts.
 To make the use of computer proliferate all over the country.

Department
 Software Department
 Hardware Department
 Information Science Department
 Application Department
 English Department
 Physics Department
 Myanmar Department
 Mathematics Department
 Cloud Computing Department

Programs
Graduate Programs
Post Graduate Programs
Under Graduate Programs

References 

Technological universities in Myanmar